Wolfgang Walter Wilhelm Bosbach (born 11 June 1952) is a German politician and member of Christian Democratic Union (CDU), which he joined in 1972. A lawyer by profession, Bosbach is a partner at Winter, Jansen & Lamsfuß in Bergisch Gladbach.

Political career 
Bosbach was a directly elected member of the Bundestag from 1994 until 2017, representing Rheinisch-Bergischer Kreis, and the deputy parliamentary group leader of his party from 2000 until 2009. From 1994 until 2002 and from 2009 until 2017, he served on the Committee on Internal Affairs.

Following the 2013 federal elections, Bosbach was part of the CDU/CSU team in the negotiations with the SPD on a coalition agreement.

In August 2016 Bosbach announced that he would not stand in the 2017 federal elections but instead resign from active politics by the end of the parliamentary term due to his deteriorating health. That same month, he agreed to serve as columnist for German tabloid Bild from 2017 on.

Career after politics 
In 2017, Minister-President Armin Laschet of North Rhine-Westphalia appointed Bosbach as chair of a commission to advise the state government on criminal justice reforms.

Ahead of the 2021 Rhineland-Palatinate state election, CDU candidate Christian Baldauf included Bosbach in his shadow cabinet for the party's campaign to unseat incumbent Malu Dreyer as Minister-President of Rhineland-Palatinate.

Political positions

European integration 
In August 2011, Bosbach became the first senior CDU MP to say he would not vote for legal changes to allow the European Financial Stability Facility to buy sovereign bonds on the market. He later criticized the permanent rescue mechanism – called European Stability Mechanism – was a step toward a European transfer union. In 2012, he told German business magazine Wirtschaftswoche that Greece should leave the euro region to overhaul its economy.

On 27 February 2015 Bosbach voted against the Merkel government's proposal for a four-month extension of Greece's bailout; in doing so, he joined a record number of 29 dissenters from the CDU/CSU parliamentary group who expressed skepticism about whether the Greek government under Prime Minister Alexis Tsipras could be trusted to deliver on its reform pledges. On 17 July he voted against the government's proposal to negotiate a third bailout for Greece; in response to the resulting discussions with fellow conservative MPs, he resigned from his office as Chairman of the Committee on Internal Affairs.

Domestic politics 
In 2013, Bosbach rejected calls to grant Muslims living in Germany two days of official holiday a year to mark important religious festivals, saying there was "no Islamic tradition in Germany" and that religious holidays here reflected the country's Christian heritage.

Other activities

Corporate boards 
 1. FC Köln, Member of the Advisory Board
 Deutsche Telekom, Member of the Data Privacy Advisory Board
 Signal Iduna Allgemeine Versicherung, Member of the Supervisory Board
 Securitas Deutschland, Member of the Supervisory Board (1998–2002)

Non-profit organizations 
 Gegen Vergessen – Für Demokratie, Member
 Rotary International, Member
 ZDF, Member of the Television Board
 1. FC Köln, Member of the Advisory Board (-2019)
 Foundation "Remembrance, Responsibility and Future", Member of the Board of Trustees (2000–2006)
 Ursula Lübbe Foundation, Member of the Board of Trustees (2005–2009)

Recognition 
 2013 – "Goldenes Steuerrad" (golden steering wheel) of the Großen Mülheimer Karnevals-Gesellschaft von 1903
 2014 – Honorary senator of the Düsseldorfer Karnevalsgesellschaft Weissfräcke

References

External links 
 
  

1952 births
Living people
People from Bergisch Gladbach
University of Cologne alumni
20th-century German lawyers
Members of the Bundestag for North Rhine-Westphalia
Members of the Bundestag 2013–2017
Members of the Bundestag 2009–2013
Members of the Bundestag 2005–2009
Members of the Bundestag 2002–2005
Members of the Bundestag 1998–2002
Members of the Bundestag 1994–1998
Members of the Bundestag for the Christian Democratic Union of Germany
Jurists from North Rhine-Westphalia